Carinodrillia is a genus of sea snails, marine gastropod mollusks in the family Pseudomelatomidae, the turrids and allies.

Description
For the species in which the spiral sculpture predominates and in which there is a tendency for the peripheral cord to form a carina, the name Carlnodrillia is proposed with Clathrodrillia halis Dall, as the type. This forms a very natural group containing a large number of species mostly unicolor, whitish or brownish.

Species
Species within the genus Carinodrillia include:
 Carinodrillia adonis Pilsbry & Lowe, 1932
 Carinodrillia alboangulata (Smith E. A., 1882)
 Carinodrillia apitoa Corea, 1934
 † Carinodrillia bella (Conrad, 1862)
 Carinodrillia bilirata (Smith E.A., 1888)
 † Carinodrillia bocatoroensis Olsson, 1922 
 Carinodrillia braziliensis (Smith E. A., 1915)
 Carinodrillia buccooensis Nowell-Usticke, 1971
 † Carinodrillia cymatoides Gardner, 1938
 Carinodrillia dariena Olsson, 1971
 Carinodrillia dichroa Pilsbry & Lowe, 1932
 † Carinodrillia elocata (Pilsbry & Johnson, 1922) 
 † Carinodrillia felis Olsson, 1964
 † Carinodrillia fermori Dey, 1961
 † Carinodrillia fusiformis (Gabb, 1873)
 Carinodrillia halis (Dall, 1919)
 Carinodrillia hexagona (Sowerby I, 1834)
 Carinodrillia lachrymosa McLean & Poorman, 1971
 Carinodrillia mamona Corea, 1934
 Carinodrillia pilsbryi (Lowe, 1935)
 † Carinodrillia pylonia Olsson & Harbison, 1953
 Carinodrillia quadrilirata (Smith E. A., 1882)
 Carinodrillia suimaca Corea, 1934
 † Carinodrillia winchesterae Pilsbry, 1922
 † Carinodrillia zooki (Brown & Pilsbry, 1911)
Species brought into synonymy
 Carinodrillia alcestris (Dall, 1919): synonym of Compsodrillia alcestis (Dall, 1919)
 Carinodrillia bicarinata (Shasky, 1961): synonym of Compsodrillia bicarinata (Shasky, 1961)
 Carinodrillia jaculum Pilsbry & H. N. Lowe, 1932: synonym of Compsodrillia jaculum (Pilsbry & H. N. Lowe, 1932) (original combination)
 Carinodrillia liella Corea, 1934: synonym of Buchema liella (Corea, 1934) (original combination)
 Carinodrillia limans Dall, 1919: synonym of Crassispira pellisphocae (Reeve, 1845)
 Carinodrillia tainoa Corea, 1934: synonym of Buchema tainoa (Corea, 1934) (original combination)

References

External links
 
 Bouchet, P.; Kantor, Y. I.; Sysoev, A.; Puillandre, N. (2011). A new operational classification of the Conoidea (Gastropoda). Journal of Molluscan Studies. 77(3): 273-308
 Worldwide Mollusc Species Data Base: Pseudomelatomidae

 
Pseudomelatomidae
Gastropod genera